Petroleum County is a county in the U.S. state of Montana. As of the 2020 census, the population was 496, making it the least populous county in Montana and the eighth-least populous in the United States. Its county seat is Winnett. The county's area was partitioned from Fergus County to become the last of Montana's 56 counties to be organized.

History
The area was home to Native American tribes of the Crow, Blackfoot, Nez Perce, and Sioux. In 1868 a trading post was established at the mouth of Musselshell River; it was named "Musselshell". Walter John Winnett, a rancher who had been adopted into the Sioux tribe, started a ranch in Montana Territory in 1879. His ranch house (built 1900) became a gathering place for the area. In 1910, he built a store and petitioned for a post office; thus Winnett became an official town.

Fort Magginis (built in western Fergus County in 1880) subdued Indian raids in the area, allowing cattle raising to prosper. Gold was also discovered in the Fergus County mountains; from 1911 to 1915, stakes in the county were claimed by prospectors.

In February 1920, oil was discovered in the SE part of the county. This area developed into the Cat Creek Field, producing high-grade crude. By 1922 it was producing 2.2 million barrels annually. The state legislature split the eastern area of Fergus County into a separate entity, named Petroleum County to denote its status as the first place in Montana where petroleum was discovered, in 1925, and designated Winnett as its seat.

The county was always one of the most sparsely populated areas of the US, and the population has continued to decline. The 1930 census listed 2,045 residents. The county was brought under administrative format of the "county manager" in 1944.
By the time of the 1980 census, the population was reduced to 685.

Geography

The county's eastern boundary is formed by the Musselshell River. The land lies in the Missouri Plateau section of the Great Plains. The uplands are generally of fairly level land and valleys while the general topography is of rolling hills and valleys except for sharp gullies on the side slopes of Missouri and Musselshell Rivers in certain stretches. The southern part of the county consists of moderate hill slopes and gentle valleys, interspersed with steep cliffs.

Highways
 U.S. Route 87
 State Highway 200
 State Highway 244

Rivers
 Missouri River
 Musselshell River

Lakes
 Wild Horse Lake
 Little Bear Lake
 War Horse Lake
 Petrolia Lake
 Yellow Water Reservoir
 Headman-Field Reservoir.

The northern part of the county has abundant surface water resources, with little agricultural land to use it. In other parts of the county, agriculture is reliant on underground water resources.

Adjacent counties

 Phillips County – north
 Garfield County – east
 Rosebud County – southeast
 Musselshell County – south
 Fergus County – west

Climate
Frost is recorded during the season for 105–135 days. Nearly 70% of rainfall occurs from April to September, also the growing season for many crops in the county.

Protected areas

 War Horse National Wildlife Refuge
 Charles M. Russell National Wildlife Refuge

Geology

A sandstone ridge with steep dips runs along the northern end of the county. This anticline is petroleum-bearing, and divides the county into two areas: to the north, geological formations of Bearpaw Shale or the Hell Creek Formation; to the south, formations containing older Cretaceous rocks. Marine shales of Cretaceous Age are found as outcrops throughout the county. Sandstones are noted in alternate sequences and are identified at deeper depths in Cat Creek.

A Tyrannosauridae fossil skeleton was discovered in the Judith River Formation, while Alamosaurus was discovered in the Hell Creek Formation.

Flora and fauna
Rangeland contains wheatgrass, forbs, shrubs, green needlegrass, blue grama, big sagebrush, plains prickly pear, wooly Indian wheat, weedlike forbs, broom snakeweed, Nuttal saltbush, prairie sandreed, horizontal juniper, plains reedgrass, golden pea, and prairie rose. Forest land covers 64,296 acres of which 6,500 acres are characterized as commercial forest land; Ponderosa pine, Douglas fir, and Plains cottonwood are noted. The forest understory features obtuse sedge, creeping juniper, Rocky Mountain juniper, bluebunch wheatgrass, Little lbuestern, and hawksbeard. The county has elk, white-tailed deer, mule deer and pronghorn antelope. There are pheasant, eagles and Gray, or Hungarian, partridge.

Economy
As of March 2012, the cost of living index in the county was 82.255 below the national average of 100. Petroleum and cattle raising are the principal economic activities; livestock farming accounts for 89.7% of the farm income. Crude oil from the Cat Creek and Rattlesnake Butte fields is piped to refineries in Billings. Agriculture, forestry, fishing and hunting are attributed to 66% of the population. 58.2% of people in the county are employed in mining. Another 15.5% are employed in educational, health and social services.
Some of the notable ranches in the county are: McArthur Ranch, Maxwell Ranch, Crooked Creek Campground, Fail Ranch, and Novak Homestead. The major crops grown in the county are wheat (both winter wheat and spring wheat) and barley. Alfalfa and grass hay are grown as cattle feed under irrigated conditions along the main river course and also on the banks of creeks such as Flat Willow, Box Elder, and Macdonald.

Demographics

As of the 2010 census, there were 494 people, 225 households, and 143 families residing in the county. The racial makeup of the county was 98.8% white, 0.0% from other races, and 1.2% from two or more races. Those of Hispanic or Latino origin made up 1.0% of the population. In terms of ancestry, 35.1% were German, 15.9% were Norwegian, 15.7% were English, 13.2% were Irish, and 3.5% were American.

Of the 225 households, 28.0% had children under the age of 18 living with them, 55.1% were married couples living together, 4.0% had a female householder with no husband present, 36.4% were non-families, and 35.1% of all households were made up of individuals. The average household size was 2.20 and the average family size was 2.83. The median age was 47.3 years.

The median income for a household in the county was $36,875 and the median income for a family was $39,107. Males had a median income of $25,991 versus $21,705 for females. The per capita income for the county was $21,008. About 18.1% of families and 16.7% of the population were below the poverty line, including 26.3% of those under age 18 and 12.7% of those age 65 or over.

Politics
Voters in Petroleum County generally vote Republican in national elections. Since 1928 they selected the Republican candidate in 78% of the elections.  The last election where Petroleum went for a Democrat was in 1964.

Town
 Winnett (county seat)

Unincorporated communities
 Cat Creek
 Mosby (partial)
 Valentine (partial)

Former communities
 Flatwillow
 Teigen

See also
 List of lakes in Petroleum County, Montana
 List of mountains in Petroleum County, Montana
 National Register of Historic Places listings in Petroleum County, Montana

References

Bibliography

External links

  Petroleum County, Montana

 
Montana counties on the Missouri River
1925 establishments in Montana
Populated places established in 1925